David Pimentel (born 2 December 1927) was a Mexican weightlifter. He competed in the men's middleweight event at the 1952 Summer Olympics.

References

External links
 

1927 births
Possibly living people
Mexican male weightlifters
Olympic weightlifters of Mexico
Weightlifters at the 1952 Summer Olympics
Sportspeople from Veracruz
20th-century Mexican people